The Reckoning may refer to:

Literature 
 The Reckoning (Armstrong novel), a 2010 novel by Kelley Armstrong
 The Reckoning (Grisham novel), a 2018 novel by John Grisham
 The Reckoning (Long novel), a 2004 novel by Jeff Long
 The Reckoning (Penman novel), a 1991 novel by Sharon Kay Penman
 The Reckoning (Halberstam book), a 1986 book by David Halberstam on the crises in the U.S. automotive industry from 1973 to the mid-1980s
 The Reckoning (Trump book), a 2021 nonfiction book by Mary L. Trump
 The Reckoning, a novel by Hugh Atkinson
 The Reckoning: The Murder of Christopher Marlowe, a book by Charles Nicholl
 "The Reckoning", a 1902 short story by Edith Wharton

Music

Albums 
 The Reckoning (Asaf Avidan & the Mojos album) (2008)
 The Reckoning (EP), a 2006 EP by Comes with the Fall
 The Reckoning (Needtobreathe album)
 The Reckoning (Pillar album)

Songs 
 "The Reckoning" (Iced Earth song)
 "The Reckoning", a 2011 song by The Getaway Plan
 "The Reckoning (How Long)", a 2010 song by Andrew Peterson from Counting Stars
 The Reckoning (Within Temptation song), 2018 song
 "The Reckoning", a 2008 song by F5

Television 
 The Reckoning (2011 TV series), a British ITV drama
 "The Reckoning" (Star Trek: Deep Space Nine), an episode of Star Trek: Deep Space Nine
 "The Reckoning"  (The Vampire Diaries), an episode of The Vampire Diaries
 "The Reckoning" (Outlander), an episode of Outlander
 "Chapter 7: The Reckoning" (The Mandalorian), an episode of The Mandalorian
 WWA The Reckoning, a professional wrestling pay-per-view from World Wrestling All-Stars
 "The Reckoning" (Xena: Warrior Princess), a Season 1 episode of the TV series
 The Reckoning (2022 TV series), a British drama

Films 
 The Reckoning (1908 film), a silent film
 The Reckoning (1970 film), a British drama film by Jack Gold
 The Reckoning (2003 film), a murder-mystery film set in the medieval period
 The Reckoning (2014 film), an Australian crime thriller
 The Reckoning (2020 film), a British adventure horror film

Gaming 
 Hunter: The Reckoning, a role-playing game from White Wolf
 Hunter: The Reckoning (video game) (2002)
 The Reckoning, an expansion for Quake 2

See also 
 Dead Reckoning (disambiguation)
 Reckoning (disambiguation)
 "Reckoning Song", a 2008 song from Asaf Avidan and the Mojos album The Reckoning
 Rick and Morty – The Rickoning, a 2019 graphic novel